Matthias Platzeck (born 29 December 1953) is a German politician. He was Minister President of Brandenburg from 2002 to 2013 and party chairman of the SPD from November 2005 to April 2006.

On 29 July 2013 Platzeck announced his resignation from his office in August for health reasons.

Early life and education
Platzeck was born in Potsdam, the son of a physician and a medical-technical assistant. After attending Polytechnic Secondary School in Potsdam from 1960 to 1966, he went through Extended Secondary School in Kleinmachnow. Following his Abitur in 1972 and military service he studied biomedical cybernetics at the Technische Universität Ilmenau from 1974 onward. After his diploma in 1979, Platzeck worked at the institute for hygiene in Karl-Marx-Stadt (today Chemnitz) in 1979–1980 and the general hospital in Bad Freienwalde from 1980 to 1982. From 1982 to 1990 he was head of the department for environmental hygiene at the agency for hygiene in Potsdam.

Political career

Platzeck co-founded ARGUS, a Potsdam environmental organization, with and at the initiative of Carola Stabe in April 1988. In April 1989, he joined the Liberal Democratic Party of Germany but left it shortly thereafter. He represented ARGUS at the founding of the Grüne Liga association of local environmental organizations in East Germany in November 1989. During the political "Wende" of 1989–1990 that led to German Reunification he was their speaker at the East German Round Table talks. From February to April 1990 he represented the oppositional radical Green Party as Minister without Portfolio in the last non-elected but legitimate government of the GDR. Platzeck was elected member of the Volkskammer in 1990 for the Green Party and was parliamentary secretary of the joined faction of Greens and Bündnis 90 (Alliance 90).

After German reunification, he was one of 144 members of the Volkskammer co-opted to the Bundestag. He did not run for a full term in the 1990 German federal election.

In October 1990 Platzeck became a member of the Landtag of Brandenburg for Bündnis 90 (Alliance 90). He was Minister for the Environment in a coalition government with the SPD and FDP from 1990 to 1994, when the coalition broke up. Rejecting the merger of his party with the West German Green Party he did not join the new party Bündnis 90/Die Grünen in 1993. Instead, he became a member of the SPD on 6 June 1995.

After the break of the Brandenburg coalition in 1994 Platzeck left his faction and remained Minister for the Environment under Minister-president Manfred Stolpe. He became popular nationwide for organizing public support for the affected population during a flood of the Oder river in 1997. In 1998 he was elected mayor of Brandenburg's capital Potsdam and rejected the offer of Chancellor Gerhard Schröder to join the federal cabinet as Minister for Transport.

In 2000 Platzeck was elected chairman of the SPD in Brandenburg and in 2002 he succeeded Manfred Stolpe as Minister-president. He was re-elected to the Landtag (state parliament) in 2004. With the SPD as strongest political force he could continue his coalition with the CDU. He served as President of the Bundesrat in 2004/05.

When Franz Müntefering resigned as party chairman of the SPD because of internal conflicts, Platzeck was elected party chairman on 15 November 2005 with an overwhelming majority of 99.8 percent. In January, February and April 2006 Platzeck suffered three severe hearing losses. Due to his ill health he resigned from his post as chairman on 10 April 2006, only five months after becoming chairman.

Life after politics 
Both in 2015 and 2016, Platzeck and Bodo Ramelow were appointed as unpaid arbitrators for negotiations between Deutsche Bahn and the German Train Drivers' Union (GDL). In 2016, he also served as unpaid arbitrator for negotiations between German airline Lufthansa and its flight attendants' union.

From 2018 until 2019, Platzeck co-chaired the German government's so-called coal commission, which is tasked to develop a masterplan before the end of the year on how to phase-out coal and create a new economic perspective for the country's coal-mining regions.

In 2019, Platzeck was appointed by the Federal Ministry of the Interior, Building and Community to chair the committee that oversaw the preparations for the 30th anniversary of German reunification. 

In late 2020, Platzeck was appointed as arbitrator in a conflict between Charité and the United Services Trade Union (ver.di); negotiations were successfully concluded by February 2021. Following her election as Governing Mayor of Berlin in September 2021, Franziska Giffey mandated Platzeck with helping to end a six-weeks long strike of Vivantes Hospital Group employees.

Platzeck was nominated by his party as delegate to the Federal Conventions for the purpose of electing the President of Germany in 2022.

In addition, Platzeck holds a variety of paid and unpaid positions, including the following:
 LEIPA Georg Leinfelder GmbH, chairman of the supervisory board (since 2015)
 German-Russian Forum, Chairman 
 Foundation for the Reconstruction of the Garrison Church, member of the board of trustees
 Internationales Bildungs- und Begegnungswerk (IBB), member of the board of trustees
 Jewish Film Festival Berlin & Brandenburg (JFBB), member of the advisory board
 Friedrich Ebert Foundation (FES), member of the board
 Schloss Neuhardenberg Foundation, member of the board of trustees

Political positions and controversy

Platzeck caused controversy in August 2010 when he called the reunification of Germany on 3 October 1990 an Anschluss, the word used by Adolf Hitler to defend the Nazi annexation of Austria in 1938. In response, Chancellor Angela Merkel rejected Platzeck's choice of words and argued that reunification was precisely what east Germans had wanted, not a process forced upon them.

On 18 November 2014, Platzeck called for the international legitimization of the annexation of Crimea by the Russian Federation, drawing criticism. He has revised his opinion. His comparison (2016) of the deployment of the Bundeswehr to Lithuania as part of the NATO Enhanced Forward Presence with Operation Barbarossa was also criticized.

Hannes Adomeit criticised in 2020 Platzeck's book about Russia . 

He has been listed by Politico  among 12 Germans who got played by Putin.

Personal life
From 1978 to 1984, Platzeck was married to Ute Bankwitz with whom he has three daughters. In 2007, he married Jeanette Jesorka. The ceremony took place one year later in Temmen-Ringenwalde, with guests including Frank-Walter Steinmeier, Günther Jauch and Andreas Dresen.

Book 
Matthias Platzeck: Zukunft braucht Herkunft. Deutsche Fragen, ostdeutsche Antworten. Hoffmann und Campe, Hamburg 2009, 
Matthias Platzeck: Wir brau­chen eine neue Ostpo­li­tik −Russ­land als Partner. Propy­läen Verlag , 2020

References

 

Matthias Platzeck löst mit seiner historischen These zur Integration der Linken Irritationen aus, Märkische Allgemeine, 1. November 2009
Thorsten Metzner: In zwei Wochen soll klar sein, ob Dreher geht. In: Der Tagesspiegel, 25. November 1998

External links 
Official biography (German)
Short official biography
Homepage

1953 births
Living people
People from Potsdam
Presidents of the German Bundesrat
Ministers of the Brandenburg State Government
Members of the Landtag of Brandenburg
Social Democratic Party of Germany politicians
Leaders of political parties in Germany
Ministers-President of Brandenburg
Grand Crosses with Star and Sash of the Order of Merit of the Federal Republic of Germany
Ilmenau University of Technology alumni